The 1871 Ohio gubernatorial election was held on October 10, 1871. Republican nominee Edward Follansbee Noyes defeated Democratic nominee George Wythe McCook with 51.75% of the vote.

General election

Candidates
Major party candidates
Edward Follansbee Noyes, Republican 
George Wythe McCook, Democratic

Other candidates
Gideon T. Stewart, Prohibition

Results

References

1871
Ohio